The Allan and Maria Myers Academic Centre is a residential college library and resource centre, serving the communities of St Mary's College and Newman College, University of Melbourne. The creation of the academic centre was supported by philanthropists Allan Myers and Maria Myers, who were residents of Newman College and St Mary's College respectively.

Location 
The centre is located in the grounds between St Mary's College and Newman College, on Swanston Street, Parkville, a suburb of Melbourne.

Building 
The building was designed in 2002 by architects Peter Corrigan and Maggie Edmond, principals of the Melbourne-based  architectural firm Edmond and Corrigan, and was opened in 2004.

Facilities

Library 
The centre's library was established by bringing together the collections from the Francis Frewin Library at St Mary's College and the Jerimiah Murphy Library at Newman College. The library presently contains over 50,000 items, from current academic texts to rare and historic books and manuscripts.

The Irish Studies Collection was initially assembled from donations by Nicholas O'Donnell and include pamphlet, softcover, and ephemera holdings of the early Gaelic Revival, mid to late nineteenth-century historical and travel accounts of Ireland, publications of scholars of old and classical Irish from the 19th and early 20th centuries, and Irish religious history.

The Medieval and Renaissance (Early Modern) Manuscript Studies Collection consists of books about medieval and renaissance art which have been assembled over almost half a century of teaching and research by Margaret Manion, an emeritus professor retired.

Tutorial and music practice rooms 
Ten tutorial rooms support the tutorial programs of both colleges, and four music practice rooms provide space for music practice and rehearsal.

References 

University of Melbourne buildings
Library buildings completed in 2004
2004 establishments in Australia
Buildings and structures in the City of Melbourne (LGA)